Clevinger may refer to:
Brian Clevinger (born 1978), American writer
Mike Clevinger, American baseball pitcher
Clevinger, a character from the novel Catch-22

See also
Clevenger (surname page)
Levinger